Chinese warbler may refer to:

Chinese bush warbler (Locustella tacsanowskia), a species of bird
Chinese leaf warbler (Phylloscopus yunnanensis), a species of bird
West Chinese leaf warbler (Phylloscopus affinis occisinensis), a subspecies of bird; also known as Alpine leaf warbler